The following is a list of characters from Hogan's Heroes, an American sitcom television series which starred  Bob Crane, Werner Klemperer and John Banner, and featured Robert Clary, Richard Dawson, Ivan Dixon, and Larry Hovis. It ran for six seasons on CBS from September 17, 1965, to April 4, 1971.

Main

Colonel Hogan

Colonel Robert E. Hogan (portrayed by Bob Crane) – United States Army Air Corps Colonel Robert E. Hogan is the main protagonist of the series, senior officer among the prisoners of war at Stalag 13, and leader of a group of prisoners who secretly sabotage the German war effort and help allies to flee Germany. Hogan commanded the 504th Bombardment Group, and was shot down and captured during a raid on Hamburg when Luftwaffe Colonel Albert Biedenbender (James Gregory) guessed Hogan's plan and developed a successful defense. Hogan graduated third in his military class, and seems to thrive on difficult if not impossible missions.  He was described by Biedenbender as having "a flair for the overcomplex" because of the complicated details of the missions he plans. 

Due to Hogan's care in planning operations, the skill of his staff, and Hogan's success at manipulating Klink and Schultz, Hogan's team is usually successful. Throughout the show, Hogan impersonates German officers, typically using aliases derived from his own name, such as "Hoganschmidt." He is a ladies' man, engaging in different relationships with Klink's secretaries, Helga and Hilda, and many of the civilian women with whom he comes into contact.

Hogan's men are extremely loyal to their commander, as he is to them. In "Two Nazis for the Price of One", Hogan and his men are ordered back to London after they discover their operation is known by a Gestapo general. When circumstances force Hogan to stay behind, the men all elect to remain with him, which visibly touches Hogan. Newkirk once disobeyed orders and explained the team's activities to an Allied general who was unaware of Hogan's real mission and chastised him for appearing to cooperate with the Nazis, with Newkirk telling the general he should "know how we all feel about Colonel Hogan" ("The General Swap"). When a British general praised Hogan's war efforts, Hogan was quick to state that he "has a good crew", crediting the men with the team's successes ("D-Day at Stalag 13").

The character was named after the actor Robert Hogan by friend and series creator Bernard Fein.

Colonel Klink

Colonel Wilhelm Klink (portrayed by Werner Klemperer) – Kommandant Oberst (Colonel) Wilhelm Klink is an old-line Luftwaffe officer of aristocratic (Junker) Prussian descent. He is shown to be inept, gullible, cowardly, overconfident, paranoid, insecure, and often clueless. He is a veteran aviator of the First World War and can be seen wearing an Iron Cross First Class, along with the 1939 clasp for a second award (spange), Ground Assault Badge of the Luftwaffe, and the Pilot's Badge. The first class Iron Cross implies that he has also earned both the Iron Cross Second Class and the Honor Cross for service in World War I.

After failing his entrance exams for law or medical school, he received an appointment to a military academy and graduated 95th in his class. Stuck at the rank of colonel for twenty years with an efficiency rating a few points above "miserable", he is the only member of his class still in the Luftwaffe who has not risen to the rank of general. As far as the Wehrmacht knows, no prisoner has ever escaped Stalag 13 during Klink's command, a record he frequently touts. Klink always wears a monocle on his left eye, usually carries a riding crop, and walks with a slight stoop. Klink is for the most part portrayed as a vain, cowardly and muddling, career officer rather than a stereotypical evil German or ardent Nazi. Klink is easily manipulated by Hogan through a combination of flattery, chicanery, and playing on Klink's fear of being sent to the Russian Front or being arrested by the Gestapo.

Klemperer reprised his role as Colonel Klink outside of the series twice: once in a cameo in a 1966 episode of Batman, and again in a 1993 episode of The Simpsons. In the episode of The Simpsons, Klink appears as the imaginary conscience of an unconscious Homer Simpson, who reveals the truth of Hogan's operations to a surprised Klink.

Sergeant Schultz

Sergeant Hans Schultz (portrayed by John Banner) – Oberfeldwebel (equivalent to Master Sergeant during World War II) Hans Schultz is Klink's portly, inept, clumsy, dim-witted, yet affable Sergeant of the Guard. He displays two stripes at the cuffs of his tunic sleeves indicating the rank of Hauptfeldwebel, which is the equivalent of a Company First Sergeant with the same pay grade as Oberfeldwebel; he wears a fictitious version of the Iron Cross (4th Grade). Schultz also has three other decorations from World War I (including the Wound Badge).

Schultz seeks to avoid trouble at all costs, and generally prefers to ignore the prisoners' suspicious activities, a desire he expresses with his catchphrase, "I know nothing!" Hogan's crew often openly discusses or carries out their operations in Schultz's presence, and they usually get him to ignore (or even assist) them, either by bribing him (usually with food) or pointing out how he himself could be implicated if he reports them to Klink. Schultz carries a Krag-Jørgensen rifle, though he never keeps it loaded, and tends to misplace it or even hand it to the prisoners when he is distracted.

Schultz often seems to be less sympathetic to the Germans than to the Allies. On occasion, Schultz mentions how he is disgusted by the war and Hitler's regime, and much preferred the days when Germany was ruled by the Kaiser. 

Like Klink, Schultz is a veteran of World War I, and in civilian life was the owner of Germany's largest toy manufacturing company. He has a wife and five children, whom he sees only on infrequent leaves. He is unfaithful, however, as he is seen dating women from the nearby town of Hammelburg who usually turn out to be either underground agents assisting Hogan and his men, or undercover Gestapo agents. Schultz is a bad gambler but above all loves to eat, particularly LeBeau's exquisite cooking.

Corporal LeBeau

Corporal Louis LeBeau (portrayed by Robert Clary) – Free French Air Force Corporal Louis LeBeau is a skilled chef and occasional tailor. He is passionate about his cooking and patriotism for France, and he often spites Germans and Nazis when they commit war crimes. LeBeau makes uniforms for the prisoners smuggled through their tunnels, and helps with disguising Hogan's men in Nazi apparel. LeBeau secretly trains the camp's guard dogs to ignore the prisoners, and is often seen using a hidden tunnel entrance located in the kennel. Though highly claustrophobic, he is used during missions to hide in small spaces such as the safe in Colonel Klink's office, boxes, crates, or a dumbwaiter. LeBeau also uses his talent as a singer to help the crew in several episodes. 

In one first-season episode, LeBeau refers to being married. Except for that one instance, he appears as a stereotypical Frenchman, attracted to many of the women with whom he comes in contact during the series. LeBeau frequently uses his culinary skills to impress Klink's guests or get him out of trouble with his superiors. Hogan also uses LeBeau's culinary prowess to gain access to Klink's guests at dinners or banquets, or to bargain for extra privileges. LeBeau is frequently seen bribing Schultz with food for information. Both Schultz and Klink frequently refer to LeBeau as "the cockroach", due to his small stature.

Actor Robert Clary was a French Jew who, during the Holocaust, was held in the Ottmuth and Buchenwald concentration camps, and still had his serial number tattooed on his arm. As of 2021, Clary was one of two living Hogan's Heroes cast members, the other being Kenneth Washington. Clary died on November 16, 2022 at the age of 96.

Corporal Newkirk

Corporal Peter Newkirk (portrayed by Richard Dawson) – Royal Air Force Corporal Peter Newkirk is the group's conman. As a skilled tailor, Newkirk is in charge of making or altering uniforms, civilian clothes, and other disguises as needed for missions or for prisoners to move out of Germany. He also uses his skills as a pick-pocket, forger, lock picker, and safe cracker on many occasions, particularly to forge Klink's signature or open the safe in Klink's office. As a card sharp, Newkirk gambles with Schultz to learn about top secret information, and is often teamed with Carter in operations.

Newkirk does numerous impersonations such as vaudeville personalities; he often impersonates German officers and can imitate the voices of Adolf Hitler and Winston Churchill. Newkirk is a ladies' man, and often tries to initiate romance with the women who appear in the series.

Sergeant Kinchloe

Staff Sergeant James Kinchloe (portrayed by Ivan Dixon) – United States Army Air Corps Staff Sergeant James "Kinch" Kinchloe is primarily responsible for radio, telephone, and other forms of electronic communications. Although outranked by Carter, Kinch acts as second-in-command in Hogan's crew; it was notable for a 1960s television show to have an African-American actor identified in such a manner.

A talented mimic, Kinchloe easily imitates German officers speaking over the radio or telephone. Kinch is from Detroit, where he worked for a telephone company before the war. Kinch was also a boxer, having fought in Golden Gloves matches as a middleweight; because of this experience, in one episode he is recruited to fight a guard from Stalag 13. Kinchloe has remarkable ability when participating in undercover activities, but due to his skin color, his roles outside of the camp are limited. He  also impersonates Germans on the telephone when circumstances require it.

Ivan Dixon left the series after the fifth season, and was replaced in the cast by Kenneth Washington for season 6. No mention was ever made on-screen explaining Kinchloe's departure from Stalag 13, and his role as radio operator was filled by Sgt. Baker.

Sergeant Baker
Sergeant Richard Baker (portrayed by Kenneth Washington) – Following Dixon's departure from the show after season five, the series producers chose to create a new character rather than recast the part of Kinchloe. Baker, like Kinchloe, was an African-American radio expert who ran the underground communications center. However, with Kinchloe's departure, Newkirk is elevated to the role of Hogan's second-in-command (despite being subordinate to both Sergeants Baker and Carter by rank) during the sixth season. As with Kinchloe, Baker is able to contribute vital support to the missions assigned to him by Col. Hogan.

Sergeant Carter

Technical Sergeant Andrew Carter (portrayed by Larry Hovis) – United States Army Air Corps Technical Sergeant Andrew J. Carter is a chemist and explosives expert in charge of ordnance and bomb-making. Prior to the war, Carter was a Boy Scout who had run a drug store in Muncie, Indiana. In the series, Carter shows a great talent in chemistry and explosives; he has a passion for making and producing formulas, chemicals, and explosive devices when needed. While bright and enthusiastic at his specialties, he is often clumsy and forgetful. The prisoners often joke that Carter is the most German-looking among them, and he is often called upon to impersonate German officers, notably Adolf Hitler.

Carter is a bachelor, and sometimes references his fiancée Mary Jane, whom he expects to marry after the war. Unlike the rest of the men, he is shown to be shy around women, and Newkirk and LeBeau often joke about his naïveté. Hovis did not want to remove his wedding ring to play the character, so to conceal it, Carter wears black gloves in most of his appearances. In the few episodes in which he is gloveless, Carter's left hand is concealed, or is visible only briefly. Although Carter is the ranking non-commissioned officer, he is never shown to exercise any real authority over the other prisoners, and Kinchloe generally acts as second-in-command to Hogan. He is part Native American, as revealed when he receives a letter from one of his Sioux relatives, and is said to be from the fictional town of Bullfrog, North Dakota. (In reality, Hovis was born on a Yakama reservation in Washington.)

In the pilot episode, "The Informer", Carter is a lieutenant who escaped from another prisoner-of-war camp, staying at Stalag 13 before continuing his journey to England, like many other Allies assisted by Hogan's crew throughout the series. By the second episode, Carter is established as a major character and permanent member of Hogan's crew.

Recurring

Fräulein Helga (portrayed by Cynthia Lynn in season 1) – Helga was Klink's first secretary. She was portrayed as neutral or pro-Allied, having assisted Hogan and his men in their operations, such as providing verification for Hogan's statements when he tries to manipulate Klink, or stealing documents to pass on to Hogan. Helga also had a flirtatious personal relationship with Hogan. In the pilot episode, Helga works as a manicurist in the prisoners' underground barber shop, but this is the only scene in the series that shows her cooperation as that extensive. Lynn left Hogan's Heroes at the end of its first season, and Helga's departure was never explained in the series. Lynn later made two guest appearances as other characters.
Fräulein Hilda (portrayed by Sigrid Valdis in seasons 2-6) – Hilda replaced Helga as Klink's secretary. Her role is very similar to Helga's, aiding the prisoners by providing information to Hogan, confirming details of the stories he tells Klink, and volunteering to accept social invitations from high-ranking Germans in order to distract or obtain information from them. Like Helga, she often flirted with Hogan. Valdis appeared on the series once in a minor role prior to being cast as Hilda. Valdis and Bob Crane were married on the show's set in 1970. Most of the cast and crew were present, and Richard Dawson served as Crane's best man.
General Albert Hans Burkhalter (portrayed by Leon Askin) – Burkhalter is Klink's gruff and rotund superior officer. His rank is equivalent to a lieutenant (three-star) general in the American forces. Burkhalter frequently tires of Klink's obsequious manner and nervous babbling ("Shut up, Klink!") and regularly threatens to send him to the Russian Front or have him shot. Burkhalter is mystified by Stalag 13's perfect record, unable to make sense of it in contrast with Klink's apparent incompetence. However, Burkhalter is also sometimes shown to be incompetent. He fears his wife, and after Hogan arranges to obtain photos of him with other women in order to blackmail him, Burkhalter frantically agrees to do whatever is necessary to save his reputation. Like Klink, Burkhalter depends on Hogan's explanations to get him out of trouble with the high command when Hogan's schemes result in German failures. In the pilot episode, he was portrayed as a colonel.
Major Wolfgang Hochstetter (portrayed by Howard Caine) – Major (Sturmbannführer) Hochstetter of the Gestapo often takes it upon himself to investigate Klink and Stalag 13, or receives orders to do so. Originally trained as a cryptologist, Hochstetter's dedication and loyalty to the Nazi cause enabled him to quickly rise through the ranks. Given the high rate of sabotage near the camp, Hochstetter is highly suspicious of Hogan and comes to regard him as "the most dangerous man in all Germany." Hochstetter's position in the Gestapo makes Klink clearly fearful of him, while Burkhalter, who openly despises Hochstetter, is not. Hochstetter's arrogance tends to get the better of him as he fails to see how he himself is manipulated by Hogan: like Klink and Burkhalter, whenever a Hogan scheme results in another German disaster, Hochstetter always accepts Hogan's advice about what to tell his superiors in Berlin in order to save his own neck. Before becoming settled into role of Hochstetter, Caine appeared as two other German officers, Major Keitel, and Gestapo Kriminaldirektor (Colonel) Feldkamp.

Colonel Rodney Crittendon (portrayed by Bernard Fox) – Crittendon is a Royal Air Force group captain. Since the United States military has no "group captain" rank, Crittendon was referred to as "colonel," the equivalent American rank, to avoid confusion for the show's US audience. He appears several times throughout the series. His date of rank is earlier than Hogan's, so he outranks Hogan, which leads to disastrous results when he overrules Hogan's orders. His medals include the Distinguished Service Order, Order of the British Empire, Military Cross and Bar, and the Distinguished Flying Cross and Bar. Crittendon initially believes that a POW's only duty is to escape, and to be involved in anything else, such as spying or sabotage, is strictly against regulations. When Crittendon is first transferred to Stalag 13, Hogan poses him a hypothetical question, asking what he would do if he were aware the POWs were engaged in spying and sabotage; Crittendon replies that he would report them to the German authorities. Crittendon constantly tries to develop and attempt escapes; however, they ultimately fail due to poor planning. In later appearances, Crittendon is aware of Hogan's operations and participates in schemes, though he is shown to be amateurish, much to Hogan's annoyance.  In the episode "Lady Chitterly's Lover," Fox played both Crittendon and British traitor Sir Charles Chitterly (possibly a parody of William Joyce, commonly known as Lord Haw-Haw), who stops at Stalag 13 with his wife Lady Leslie Chitterly (Anne Rogers) while on their way to visit Adolf Hitler, whom they consider a friend. Lookalike Crittendon is broken out of Stalag 16, and replaces Sir Charles.
Marya (Nita Talbot) – Marya is a Russian White émigré spy whose work occasionally aligns with Hogan's. She often appears as the trusted paramour of a high-ranking German officer or scientist. Her mission is to either discredit them or set them up for arrest, as she notes that "...We cannot trust Hitler to shoot all his own generals". She meets Hogan and LeBeau in Paris during the second season, where she learns of their Stalag 13 activities. Her schemes often come into conflict with Hogan's, but her plans and Hogan's always turn out to be compatible. Marya constantly flirts with Hogan, to his discomfort, and also flirts with LeBeau. Infatuated, LeBeau trusts her and believes her to be someone who will never sell out to the Nazis, but Hogan is always wary of her and suspicious of her motives. Klink is also suspicious of Marya, stating that trouble always ensues when she visits Stalag 13.
Oscar Schnitzer (portrayed by Walter Janowitz) - Schnitzer is an elderly veterinarian and dog trainer who keeps Stalag 13 supplied with guard dogs. He is a member of the German underground resistance, and secretly in league with Hogan and his men. Schnitzer's truck is occasionally used for smuggling people in and out of camp, as the guards are afraid of the dogs, and as such will not look inside the truck.
Tiger (portrayed by Arlene Martel) – Tiger is a French Underground contact who has several encounters with Hogan. Hogan notes that Tiger has saved his life at least once; He describes her as 'the' leader of the French Underground. Hogan frees Tiger from the Gestapo twice: once on the way to Berlin by train, and once from Gestapo headquarters in Paris.
Captain Fritz or Felix Gruber (portrayed by Dick Wilson) – Gruber is Klink's adjutant in "Don't Forget to Write", and becomes the new ruthless Kommandant of Stalag 13 after Klink mistakenly volunteers for the Russian Front. Because Gruber is hard-nosed and not easy to manipulate, the prisoners desperately want to get Klink back. Hogan orders three prisoners to escape and hide. When Gruber is unable to recapture them, Burkhalter orders Klink to find them, which he does with Hogan's aid.  Burkhalter decides to leave him as Kommandant. Gruber appears in one scene each of two other episodes (with Hogan assuming his identity to visit the home of a general in the first of those episodes). In addition to Gruber, several other junior officers and capable NCOs are occasionally assigned to Klink's command, but Hogan always finds a way to get rid of them.
Corporal Karl Langenscheidt (portrayed by Jon Cedar) – Langenscheidt is one of Schultz's guards. He is only seen or spoken of occasionally (mostly in the first-season episodes). He often arrives with poor timing, such as informing Klink that an important guest has arrived unannounced, much to Klink's displeasure. In "Art for Hogan's Sake", Langenscheidt gets involved in Hogan's scheme to forge the priceless Édouard Manet painting "The Fife Player", and switch it for the real one General Burkhalter had "requisitioned" from the Louvre in Paris to give to Hermann Göring as a birthday present.
Frau Gertrude Linkmeyer (née Burkhalter) (portrayed by Kathleen Freeman, played once by Alice Ghostley) – Frau Linkmeyer is General Burkhalter's sister. She is usually in a one-sided relationship with Klink, who does not return her affection. Her previous husband, Otto, is missing in action on the Russian Front; this leads General Burkhalter to arrange meetings between her and Klink in order to marry her off. Later in the series ("Kommandant Gertrude"), Frau Linkmeyer arrives at the camp with her new (and reluctant) fiancé, Major Wolfgang Karp (Lee Bergere), whom she intends to have replace Klink as Kommandant, but Hogan manages to foil her plans and their engagement.
Lieutenant Maurice DuBois (portrayed by Felice Orlandi) – Maurice DuBois is a French Underground contact who appeared in three episodes. (Orlandi's real-life wife, Alice Ghostley, appeared in two episodes.)

Major Bonacelli (portrayed by Hans Conried in the first appearance, Vito Scotti in the second appearance) – Bonacelli is the commander of an Italian prisoner-of-war camp near the fictional city of Capezio. Bonacelli does not support the Fascist war effort, and attempts to desert to Switzerland in "The Pizza Parlor" under the guise of a trip to Stalag 13 to study Klink's operations. Hogan convinces him to instead return to his camp and act as an Allied spy. Bonacelli appears again in "The Return of Major Bonacelli," having traveled to Stalag 13 after he is discovered as an Allied agent. Hogan talks Bonacelli into photographing the new advanced German anti-aircraft gun before defecting to England, narrowly escaping capture by Hochstetter in the process. 
Olsen (portrayed by Stewart Moss) – Olsen is Hogan's "outside man"; when someone is brought into the camp, Olsen goes out to ensure that the number of prisoners remains the same. In the pilot episode "The Informer," Carter asks Hogan what Olsen does while out of the camp, and Hogan says, "We never ask him." In the episode "Some of Their Planes Are Missing," Olsen takes Hogan's place in a bed, pretending to be asleep, so that the Germans would not know that Hogan is out of the camp.
Sergeant Vladimir Minsk (portrayed by Leonid Kinskey) – Minsk is one of Hogan's men, a Russian sergeant, who appears only in the pilot. Kinskey declined to return for further episodes, and was replaced in the main cast by Larry Hovis as Carter.
 Addison, Broughton, Walters, and Slim (portrayed by Roy Goldman -Walters- and three unknown actors) – Four prisoners in Hogan's barracks who serve as extras in crowd scenes and occasionally provide minor support for operations requiring more men than Hogan's core team. They appear in the majority of the show's episodes, but have almost no dialogue and are never listed in the credits.

References 

Hogan's Heroes